Jamieson Line is a closed border crossing connecting Athelstan, Quebec to Burke, New York on the Canada–US border. Canada closed its port of entry on April 1, 2011, and tore down its border inspection station in 2012.  The US Customs and Border Protection closed its port of entry on August 21, 2014.

See also
 List of Canada–United States border crossings

References

Canada–United States border crossings
Geography of Franklin County, New York
Geography of Montérégie
1945 establishments in New York (state)
1945 establishments in Quebec
2011 disestablishments in Quebec
2014 disestablishments in New York (state)